or  is a lake in the municipality of Hamarøy in Nordland county, Norway.  The lake lies just west of the village of Tømmerneset.  The European route E6 highway runs along the eastern shore of the lake.  The lake Strindvatnet lies to the south of this lake.

See also
List of lakes in Norway

References

Hamarøy
Lakes of Nordland